In mathematics, the discrete Poisson equation is the finite difference analog of the Poisson equation. In it, the discrete Laplace operator takes the place of the Laplace operator. The discrete Poisson equation is frequently used in numerical analysis as a stand-in for the continuous Poisson equation, although it is also studied in its own right as a topic in discrete mathematics.

On a two-dimensional rectangular grid
Using the finite difference numerical method to discretize
the 2-dimensional Poisson equation (assuming a uniform spatial discretization) on an  grid gives the following formula:

The preferred arrangement of the solution vector is to use natural ordering which, prior to removing boundary elements, would look like:

This will result in an  linear system:

where

For each  equation, the columns of  correspond to a block of  components in :

and

respectively.

Example 

For a 3×3 (  and  ) grid with all the boundary nodes prescribed, the system would look like:

with

and

As can be seen, the boundary 's are brought to the right-hand-side of the equation.

and

Methods of solution 

Because  is block tridiagonal and sparse, many methods of solution
An optimal  solution can also be computed using multigrid methods.

Applications 

In computational fluid dynamics, for the solution of an incompressible flow problem, the incompressibility condition acts as a constraint for the pressure. There is no explicit form available for pressure in this case due to a strong coupling of the velocity and pressure fields. In this condition, by taking the divergence of all terms in the momentum equation, one obtains the pressure poisson equation.

For an incompressible flow this constraint is given by:

Taking divergence of the momentum equation and using the incompressibility constraint, the pressure Poisson equation is formed given by:

The discrete Poisson's equation arises in the theory of Markov chains. It appears as the relative value function for the dynamic programming equation in a Markov decision process, and as the control variate for application in simulation variance reduction.

Footnotes

References
Hoffman, Joe D.,  Numerical Methods for Engineers and Scientists, 4th Ed., McGraw–Hill Inc., New York, 1992.
Sweet, Roland A.,  SIAM Journal on Numerical Analysis, Vol. 11, No. 3 , June 1974, 506–520.

Finite differences
Numerical differential equations